Arimoclomol (INN; originally codenamed BRX-345, which is a citrate salt formulation of BRX-220) is an experimental drug developed by CytRx Corporation, a biopharmaceutical company based in Los Angeles, California.  In 2011 the worldwide rights to arimoclomol were bought by Danish biotech company Orphazyme ApS. The European Medicines Agency (EMA) and U.S. Food & Drug Administration (FDA) granted orphan drug designation to arimoclomol as a potential treatment for Niemann-Pick type C in 2014 and 2015 respectively.

Mechanism of action 

Arimoclomol is believed to function by stimulating a normal cellular protein repair pathway through the activation of molecular chaperones.   Since damaged proteins, called aggregates, are thought to play a role in many diseases, CytRx believes that arimoclomol could treat a broad range of diseases.

Arimoclomol activates the heat shock response. It is believed to act at Hsp70.

History 

Arimoclomol has been shown to extend life in an animal model of ALS and was well tolerated in healthy human volunteers in a Phase I study. CytRx is currently conducting a Phase II clinical trial.

Arimoclomol also has been shown to be an effective treatment in an animal model of Spinal Bulbar Muscular Atrophy (SBMA, also known as Kennedy's Disease).

Arimoclomol was discovered by Hungarian researchers, as a drug candidate to treat insulin resistance and diabetic complications such as retinopathy, neuropathy and nephropathy. Later, the compound, along with other small molecules, was screened for further development by Hungarian firm Biorex, which was sold to CytRx Corporation, who developed it toward a different direction from 2003.

References

Drugs acting on the nervous system
1-Piperidinyl compounds
Amine oxides
3-Pyridyl compounds